Bobby Cunliffe (born 17 May 1945) is an English former professional footballer who played as an inside forward in the Football League for Manchester City and York City.

In the 1970–71 season he played six times (scoring one goal) for Mossley.

References

1945 births
Living people
Footballers from Manchester
Association football inside forwards
English footballers
Manchester City F.C. players
York City F.C. players
Witton Albion F.C. players
English Football League players
Mossley A.F.C. players